Camellia Institute of Engineering & Technology, commonly known as CIET, is a technical degree college located in Bud Bud, Purba Bardhaman in the Indian state of West Bengal.

Courses

 Civil Engineering
 Computer Science and Engineering
 Electronics and Communication Engineering
 Electrical Engineering
 Mechanical Engineering

References

External links
 

Universities and colleges in Purba Bardhaman district
Educational institutions established in 2009
2009 establishments in West Bengal
Colleges affiliated to West Bengal University of Technology